The 2006 Tampa Bay Devil Rays season was their ninth since the franchise was created. They finished last in the AL East division, posting a league-worst record of 61–101. Their manager was Joe Maddon, who entered his first season with the Devil Rays. The Devil Rays' offense had the fewest runs (689), hits (1,395) and RBI (650) in Major League Baseball, as well as the joint-lowest batting average (.255) and lowest on-base percentage (.314).

Offseason
December 2, 2005: Pete LaForest was selected off waivers by the San Diego Padres from the Tampa Bay Devil Rays.
December 7, 2005: Dewon Brazelton was traded by the Tampa Bay Devil Rays to the San Diego Padres for Sean Burroughs.
January 18, 2006: Luis Rivas was signed as a free agent with the Tampa Bay Devil Rays.
January 31, 2006: Russell Branyan was signed as a free agent with the Tampa Bay Devil Rays.

Regular season

Season standings

Record vs. opponents

Opening Day starters
Carl Crawford
Jonny Gomes
Nick Green
Toby Hall
Damon Hollins
Aubrey Huff
Travis Lee
Seth McClung
Tomás Pérez
Ty Wigginton

Transactions
 Evan Longoria was drafted by the Tampa Bay Devil Rays in the 1st round of the June amateur draft.
July 12, 2006: Aubrey Huff was traded by the Tampa Bay Devil Rays with cash to the Houston Astros for Ben Zobrist and Mitch Talbot (minors).
August 24, 2006: Russell Branyan was traded by the Tampa Bay Devil Rays to the San Diego Padres for a player to be named later and Evan Meek (minors). The San Diego Padres sent Dale Thayer (minors) (September 15, 2006) to the Tampa Bay Devil Rays to complete the trade.

Roster

Player stats

Batting

Starters by position 
Note: Pos = Position; G = Games played; AB = At bats; H = Hits; Avg. = Batting average; HR = Home runs; RBI = Runs batted in

Other batters 
Note: G = Games played; AB = At bats; H = Hits; Avg. = Batting average; HR = Home runs; RBI = Runs batted in

Pitching

Starting pitchers 
Note: G = Games pitched; IP = Innings pitched; W = Wins; L = Losses; ERA = Earned run average; SO = Strikeouts

Other pitchers 
Note: G = Games pitched; IP = Innings pitched; W = Wins; L = Losses; ERA = Earned run average; SO = Strikeouts

Relief pitchers 
Note: G = Games pitched; W = Wins; L = Losses; SV = Saves; ERA = Earned run average; SO = Strikeouts

Farm system

LEAGUE CHAMPIONS: Montgomery

References

External links
2006 Tampa Bay Devil Rays at Baseball Reference
2006 Tampa Bay Devil Rays team page at www.baseball-almanac.com

Tampa Bay Devil Rays seasons
Tampa Bay Devil Rays
Tampa Bay Devil RAys